Murrayglossus is a genus in the family Tachyglossidae. It contains a single species, Murrayglossus hacketti, also called Hackett's giant echidna, an extinct species of echidna from Western Australia that is dated to the Pleistocene. It is known only from a few bones. This makes it the largest monotreme known to have ever lived. Historically treated as a species of long-beaked echidnas, it was separated into its own genus Murrayglossus in 2022. The generic name combines the last name of paleontologist Peter Murray and glossus, the Greek word for "tongue".

Description
 
M. hacketti had longer, straighter legs than any of the modern echidnas. Augee (2006) speculates that this feature made the animal more adept at traversing through thickly wooded forests. The main diagnostic characteristics of genus Murrayglossus are a set of femoral traits: a low femoral head; the very low position of the lesser trochanter relative to head (situated directly below the internal margin of the femur); the large trochanter that has a high position relative to the head; a flared medial epicondyle; and  obliquely oriented condyles.

Discoveries
Fossils of Murrayglossus hacketti were discovered in Mammoth Cave, Western Australia, and excavated in 1909. They were found mixed with the remains of other taxa such as Sthenurus and Macropus. Australian paleontologist Ludwig Glauert described the fossils in a 1914 publication. The specific epithet hacketti honours John Winthrop Hackett, "as a slight acknowledgement of his generous support which alone rendered the exploration of these caves possible.". The material is poor, mostly vertebra and leg bones, and the cranial material is completely absent, making M. hacketti'''s historical classification into the genus Zaglossus uncertain. Some of the fossils have incisions and burn marks, suggesting that M. hacketti was at least occasionally hunted by humans.

Aboriginal rock art found in Arnhem Land in the Northern Territory may represent M. hacketti or the extant western long-beaked echidna (Zaglossus bruijni'').

References

 

Pleistocene mammals of Australia
Prehistoric monotremes
Fossil taxa described in 2022
Taxa named by Tim Flannery